Stoyan Todorchev (Bulgarian: Стоян Тодорчев; born 27 October 1984) is a Bulgarian strongman competitor and entrant to the World's Strongest Man competition.

Strongman career
Stoyan Todorchev was twice Bulgaria's Strongest Man in 2004 and 2005. He finished sixth in the 2007 edition of Europe's Strongest Man. Stoyan competed in the 2007 World's Strongest Man where he finished third in his qualifying group behind Don Pope and Sebastian Wenta, failing to qualify for the finals. he competed again at the 2010 World's Strongest Man but again failed to qualify for the finals. Stoyan finished second overall for the 2009 Strongman Super Series season behind Brian Shaw.

Competition record

2004 
 #1 - Bulgaria's Strongest Man

2005 
 #1 - Bulgaria's Strongest Man

2006 
 #1 - World Strongman Cup Federation 2006: Wiedeń
 #3 - World Strongman Cup Federation 2006: Grodzisk Mazowiecki
 #3 - World Strongman Cup Federation 2006: Podolsk

2007 
 #2 - Polish Grand Prix
 #2 - Europe's Strongest Man 2007
 #2 - World Strongman Cup Federation 2007: Moscow
 #2 - World Strongman Cup Federation 2007: Dartford
 #1 - Grand Prix of Khanty-Mansijsk (WSMC)

2008 
 #3 - World Strongman Federation: Irkuck
 #1 - The Globe's Strongest Man, Grand Prix Moskwy
 #4 - Strongman Champions League 2008: Sofia
 #7 - Europe's Strongest Man 2008
 #2 - Poland vs Europe

2009 
 #5 - Super Series 2009: Bukareszt
 #3 - The Globe's Strongest Man, Grand Prix Moscow
 #2 - Super Series 2009: Venice Beach
 #2 - Super Series 2009: Göteborg

References

Bulgarian strength athletes
Living people
1984 births